The National Assembly or Rastriya Sabha is the upper house of the Federal Parliament of Nepal, the lower house being the House of Representatives. The composition and powers of the Assembly are established by Part 8 and 9 of the Constitution of Nepal. There are a total of 59 members: 8 members are elected from each of the seven provinces by an electoral college of each province, and three are appointed by the President on recommendation of the government.

Members serve staggered six year terms such that the term of one-third members expires every two years.

History
The National Assembly was first provisioned by the "Constitution of the Kingdom of Nepal 1990", which replaced the old panchayat system of parliament with a bicameral parliament. The National Assembly under the 1990 Constitution was dissolved on 15 January 2007 and replaced by a unicameral Interim Legislature. Following two Constituent Assembly elections which also served as a unitary Legislature Parliament, the constitution, promulgated on 20 September 2015, provisioned for a National Assembly as the upper house of the federal parliament.

Maha Sabha
Mahasabha was the upper house of the bicameral parliament of the Kingdom of Nepal during 1959 - 1962.

The Revolution of 1951 made the process to enact a new constitution, which was able to transfer all executive powers back to the Shah kings from Rana regime. King Mahendra was unable to resist the increasingly well-orchestrated political demands by the Nepali National Congress for a more democratic and representative government, and was forced to promulgate a new constitution.

The Constitution of the Kingdom of Nepal, 1959 proclaimed on 12 February 1959, describes about Mahasabha as: "There shall be a Parliament which shall consist of His Majesty and two Houses, to be known respectively as the Senate (Maha Sabha) and the House of Representatives (Pratinidhi Sabha)" (Article No. 18, Constitution of the Kingdom of Nepal, 1959).

The constitution of Kingdom of Nepal, 1959 lasted till 16 December 1962. On 16 December 1962, the new Constitution of Kingdom of Nepal, 1962 was proclaimed and the parliament of the Kingdom of Nepal became unicameral. Mahasabha couldn't continue more than two years.

Rastriya Panchayat
Rastriya Panchayat was a constitution introduce on December 16, 1962, by King Mahendra. A four-tier system of indirectly elected councils was established from the village to the national level. The Rastriya Panchayat declared Nepal a Hindu state. The people's movement of 1990 brought an end to absolute monarchy and Panchayat system.

Membership
The qualifications for being a member of National Assembly are laid out in Article 87 of the constitution and the National Assembly Member Election Act, 2017:
 must be a citizen of Nepal
 must be at least thirty-five years of age on date of nomination
 must have name listed on voter list
 should not have been convicted of a criminal offense involving moral turpitude
 must not be disqualified by any Federal law
 must not be holding any office of profit.

Election procedure
Each of the seven provinces elects 8 members each and Government of Nepal nominates 3 members and recommends to the President for approval.

The electoral college consists of members of the provincial assembly and chairperson/mayor and vice-chairperson/deputy mayor of the local bodies within the province. Each provincial assembly member's vote has a weight of forty eight whereas each chairperson/mayor/vice-chairperson/deputy mayor's vote has a weight of eighteen.

Out of the eight members from each province, three must be women, one must be from the Dalit community, and one must be a disabled person or from a minority community. Each elector gets four ballots; one for the three open seats, one for the three female seats, one for the dalit seat and one for the disabled or minority seat. The three open and three female seats are filled by single transferable vote, the two other seats by FPTP.

The election is conducted by the Election Commission.

Chairpersons and deputy chairpersons

Current membership by party

See also 
 List of members of the National Assembly of Nepal

Explanatory notes

References

Government of Nepal
History of Nepal (1951–2008)
Nepal
Parliament of Nepal
1990 establishments in Nepal